Alexander Vargo (Russian: Александр Варго) is an official pseudonym used by group of Russian horror writers whose books are published by Eksmo publishing house in the Myst (Black Book) series.

History

Vargo's first novel, The Cook (Russian: Кулинар), was released in 2003. For several years readers thought that Alexander Vargo was a real author, but soon a rumor appeared that a whole group of writers was standing behind this name.
The rumor was proved true in the beginning of 2011 when Darker magazine released an interview with a few authors of the "Vargo"-team and they confirmed that the real Alexander Vargo never existed and the series was just a publisher's project . The name of the original "Vargo"-writer is Sergey Dyomin (Russian: Сергей Дёмин). Several of "Vargo's" books were also written by Igor Isaichev and Alexei Sholokhov.

Bibliography

2003 The Cook (Кулинар)
2008 Asylum (Приют)
2008 The Something (Нечто)
2008 Wild Beach (Дикий пляж)
2008 Cocktail Ice (Льдинка)
2008 Root of All Evil (Корень зла)
2008 The Clairvoyant (Медиум)
2009 The Puppet (Кукла)
2009 House in a Ravine (Дом в овраге)
2009 Christmas (Кристмас)
2010 Midnight (Полночь)
2011 Species (Особь)
2011 Makeup Man (Гримёр)
2011 Unhuman (Нечеловек)
2011 The Sarcophagus (Саркофаг)
2011 Wraith Awakes (Морок пробуждается)
2012 Electrician (Электрик)

External links
 Alexander Vargo: the revealing interview

Russian horror writers
Collective pseudonyms